In Semitic linguistics, the elative (literally meaning "noun of preference") is a stage of gradation that can be used to express comparatives or superlatives. The Arabic elative has a special inflection similar to that of colour and defect adjectives but differs in the details. To form an elative, the consonants of the adjective's root are placed in the transfix  (or  if the second and third root consonants are the same), which generally inflects for case but not for gender or number. Furthermore, elatives belong to the diptote declension. E.g.   'small' derives the elative   'smaller',   'new' derives   'newer',   'rich' (root ) derives   'richer'.

However, there are several words that have particular feminine and plural forms when the elative is prefixed with the definite article, although the agreement is not always observed in modern usage. The feminine singular in such cases takes the transfix CuCCā, the masculine plural takes ’aCCaCūna or ’aCāCiC, and the feminine plural takes CuCCayāt or CuCaC. These feminine and plural forms had much more extensive use in ancient poetry. E.g.

The adjectives   'other' and   'first' also take elative forms even though they do not have comparative meaning.

References

Linguistic morphology
Semitic linguistics
Arabic grammar

nn:Elativ